Ve with caron is a letter of the Cyrillic script. 

It is used in the Shughni and Wakhi languages, where it represents the voiced labial–velar approximant , like ⟨w⟩ in "wait".

Computing codes
Being a relatively recent letter, not present in any legacy 8-bit Cyrillic encoding, the letter В̌ is not represented directly by a precomposed character in Unicode either; it has to be composed as В+Caron.